The Netherlands national roller hockey team is the national team side of Netherlands at international roller hockey. Usually is part of FIRS Roller Hockey B World Cup and CERH European Roller Hockey Championship.

Netherlands squad - 2010 FIRS Roller Hockey B World Cup

Team Staff
 General Manager:Martin Van Lieshout
 General Manager:Anton Sorensen

Coaching Staff
 Head Coach: Freddy Grysaels
 Assistant: Martyn Baeten

Titles

References

External links
Official website of Nederlandse Roller Hockey

National Roller Hockey Team
Roller hockey
National roller hockey (quad) teams